Ashton-under-Lyne bus station is a bus station that is located in the town of Ashton-under-Lyne in Greater Manchester, run by Transport for Greater Manchester. The bus station is situated on Wellington Road and adjoins the Arcades Shopping Centre. The bus station was opened in 2020 and replaced the previous bus station that was built on the current site.

Ashton-under-Lyne tram stop is alongside the bus station, Ashton-under-Lyne railway station is also a short walk away.

Services

Many bus services use the bus station. The majority of services are run by Stagecoach Manchester with the remainder of services run by First Greater Manchester and Manchester Community Transport.

There are frequent buses running to Stockport, Manchester, Derbyshire, Oldham and Rochdale, plus several parts of the Tameside area including Droylsden, Stalybridge, Hyde, Dukinfield, Denton, Gee Cross, Mossley, Hattersley and Audenshaw. Buses also run to parts of Stockport, such as Reddish, Heaton Chapel and Woodley, plus Failsworth, Saddleworth,  Chadderton, Hathershaw and Royton in Oldham, Hadfield and Glossop in Derbyshire and Middleton in Rochdale. Parts of Manchester also include Higher Crumpsall, Moston and Clayton.

Future
On July 7, 2014, the current Deputy Prime Minister, Nick Clegg announced that, as part of Greater Manchester's wider Growth Deal package, development of a new interchange facility within Ashton Town Centre replacing the current "island" style waiting shelters with a single high quality interchange building, incorporating bus and Metrolink within one site to create a new multi-modal interchange facility within Ashton Town Centre.

Work commenced on Tameside Interchange in June 2018, and construction is complete and the Bus Station is now fully operational. Now completed, the new Interchange has;

- A covered concourse and seated waiting area

- A ticket and information outlet and retail facilities.

- An electronic passenger information including bus, Metrolink and rail information screens.

-Accessible toilets, baby-changing and "Changing Places" facilities 
-Secure cycle parking with a cycle hub.

-Enhanced passenger security including CCTV

-Improved taxi facilities.

References

External links

Bus stations in Greater Manchester
Buildings and structures in Ashton-under-Lyne